The Vithabai Narayangaokar lifetime achievement award by the Government of Maharashtra since 2006. is given to a senior tamasha (folk art) artiste.The honour conveys the money prize of Rs 5 lakh, a citation and a memento.

Recipients
The recipients of the Vithabai Narayangaonkar Lifetime Achievement Award are as follows

References

Civil awards and decorations of Maharashtra